The 1992 Asian Junior Athletics Championships was the fourth edition of the international athletics competition for Asian under-20 athletes, organised by the Asian Athletics Association. It took place from 2–5 December in New Delhi, India. A total of 40 events were contested, 22 for male athletes and 18 for female athletes.

Medal summary

Men

Women

1992 Medal Table

References

Results
Asian Junior Championships 1992. World Junior Athletics History. Retrieved on 2013-10-19.

External links
Asian Athletics official website

Asian Junior Championships
Asian Junior Athletics Championships
International athletics competitions hosted by India
Athletics in New Delhi
Asian Junior Athletics Championships
Asian Junior Athletics Championships
1992 in youth sport
Sports competitions in Delhi